PTAL may refer to:

 Public transport accessibility level, a method sometimes used in UK transport planning to assess the access level of geographical areas to public transport
 Phenylalanine/tyrosine ammonia-lyase, an enzyme
 Postgraduate Training Authorization Letter